Jon Edward Zuber (born December 10, 1969) is an American former professional baseball first baseman. He played parts of two seasons in Major League Baseball (MLB) for the Philadelphia Phillies in 1996 and 1998. He also played one season in Nippon Professional Baseball (NPB) for the Yokohama BayStars in 2001. He is currently an assistant coach at his alma mater, The University of California, Berkeley.

Early life

He attended Campolindo High School in Moraga, California.

Career
Zuber was drafted by the Phillies in the 12th round of the 1992 MLB draft. He was a .250 career hitter over 68 major league games. He hit .253 in 1996 and .244 in 1998, though with 2 home runs in only 45 at bats for a .489 slugging average.

References

External links

1969 births
Living people
American expatriate baseball players in Japan
Baseball players from California
Baseball players at the 1999 Pan American Games
Batavia Clippers players
California Golden Bears baseball players
Clearwater Phillies players
Columbus Clippers players
Indianapolis Indians players
Major League Baseball first basemen
Pan American Games medalists in baseball
Pan American Games silver medalists for the United States
People from Encino, Los Angeles
People from Moraga, California
Philadelphia Phillies players
Reading Phillies players
Scranton/Wilkes-Barre Red Barons players
Spartanburg Phillies players
United States national baseball team players
Yokohama BayStars players
Medalists at the 1999 Pan American Games
Mat-Su Miners players